George Bowman (August 1883 – death date unknown) was an American Negro league second baseman in 1909 and 1910.

A native of Coraopolis, Pennsylvania, Bowman was the brother of fellow Negro leaguer Emmett Bowman. He played for the Buxton Wonders in 1909, and for the St. Paul Colored Gophers the following season.

References

External links
Baseball statistics and player information from Baseball-Reference Black Baseball Stats and Seamheads

1883 births
Date of birth missing
Year of death missing
Place of death missing
Buxton Wonders players
St. Paul Colored Gophers players